Seventh Avenue, also known as the Ahmed Nadeem Qasmi Avenue, is a signal free road located in Islamabad. It starts from the intersection on Khayaban-e-Iqbal (Margalla Road) near Islamabad Zoo, and ends at the intersection on Srinagar Highway.

Seventh Avenue was built at a cost of about PKR 70 million. Recently, local traffic police decided to install speed cameras on the road to check over speeding motorists.

On 25 February 2017, the Capital Development Authority decided to rename the road after the late writer Ahmad Nadeem Qasmi.

See also 
 Islamabad Highway
 Jinnah Avenue
 Faizabad Interchange
 Kashmir Highway

References

External links 
 Capital Development Authority
 Islamabad Capital Territory Administration

Islamabad
Roads in Islamabad
Roads in Islamabad Capital Territory